Harold Murray Schedlich (5 September 1915 – 9 October 2003) was an Australian rules footballer who played with St Kilda in the Victorian Football League (VFL).

After 3 games with St Kilda in 1947, Schedlich moved to Yarrawonga in 1949.

Notes

External links 

1915 births
2003 deaths
Australian rules footballers from Victoria (Australia)
St Kilda Football Club players